Rodney Van Johnson (born February 20, 1961, in Cincinnati, Ohio) is an American actor known for portraying the role of T.C. Russell on the daytime soap opera Passions. Also known for ABC Port Charles, CBS Young and the Restless, CBS Pensacola Wings of Gold,The Magic (2021) and Holiday Hideaway (2022) Kym (2022) LACE (2022). He is a single father of three boys Quincy, Alexis and Josh.

Biography
Prior to joining Passions, Johnson played Sebastian Dupree on the now-defunct ABC soap opera Port Charles in 1999. He also portrayed Trey Stark on the CBS soap opera The Young and the Restless from 1998–1999. He also starred as First Lieutenant Wendell McCray on the syndicated series Pensacola: Wings of Gold from 1997–1998. He is the great-great-grandson of Oliver Lewis, who won the very first Kentucky Derby aboard Aristides in 1875.

External links 

1961 births
Living people
American male soap opera actors